Orto-Say is a village in northern Kyrgyzstan. Its population was 4111 in 2009. The village is administratively subordinated to the Lenin District within the city of Bishkek.

References

Populated places in Bishkek